Nitesh Aswani (born 8 April 1996) is a Indian professional footballer who plays for I-League club Kenkre FC. He made his I-League debut against Indian Arrows on 3 March 2020 at the Cooperage Ground in Mumbai.

Youth career 
Nitesh Aswani started his career from Mumbai at a very young age. He played for a school named Our Lady of Perpetual Succour (OLPS) in Chembur, Mumbai. As a young player, he participated in the famous Gothia Cup which is an international youth association football tournament organized by professional football club BK Häcken, which has been held annually since 1975 in Gothenburg, Sweden. He further moved on to play for the U17 side of Kenkre FC which is a Second division I-League club in India.

He has been called up for U23 India national team Camp in 2017 and 2018.

Senior career 
Nitesh had impressed the coaches at Kenkre FC with his performances in their U17 team. This led to his promotion into the senior team which plays in the 2nd division I-League. He then moved on to play for Pune City FC (now known as Hyderabad FC). There he was a part of the senior teams as well as the reserves team which participates in the 2nd division I-League. He then moved on to play for South United FC, Bangalore in the second division.

In 2019, Nitesh Aswani signed for top division club, Minerva Punjab FC. He made his debut against Indian Arrows as came on in the 71st minute of the game replacing Cavin Lobo.

References 

RoundGlass Punjab FC players
Indian footballers
1996 births
Living people
Footballers from Mumbai
Association football defenders